Angeli senza paradiso ("Angels without Paradise") is a 1970 Italian "musicarello" directed by  Ettore Maria Fizzarotti. It is an unofficial remake of the 1933 film Gently My Songs Entreat by  Willi Forst.

Cast 
 Al Bano as Franz Schubert
 Romina Power as  Anna Roskoff
 Agostina Belli as  Marta
 Paul Müller as  Hermann Fux
 Cinzia De Carolis as  Irina Roskoff
 Wolf Fischer as  Baron Ludwig
 Caterina Boratto as Princess Vorokin
 Gérard Herter as count Roskoff
 Renato Malavasi as  Schultz
 Edoardo Toniolo as school director
 Emma Baron as mother of Martha
  as Karl

References

External links

1970 films
Musicarelli
Cultural depictions of Franz Schubert
Films about classical music and musicians
Films directed by Ettore Maria Fizzarotti
Films set in the 19th century
Films set in Vienna
Films about composers
1970s musical comedy films
Films with screenplays by Giovanni Grimaldi
Films scored by Angelo Francesco Lavagnino
Italian remakes of foreign films
Remakes of Austrian films
Remakes of German films
1970s Italian-language films
1970s Italian films